Teddy Long (1 July 1921 – 6 September 2008) was an  Australian rules footballer who played with North Melbourne in the Victorian Football League (VFL).

Notes

External links 

1921 births
2008 deaths
Australian rules footballers from Victoria (Australia)
North Melbourne Football Club players